Mansur Kuh castle (also Mansurkuh or Mansurakuh) is a historical castle located in Damghan County in Semnan Province, The longevity of this fortress dates back to the Nizari Ismaili state.

References 

Castles in Iran
Castles of the Nizari Ismaili state